Ernest William "Ted" Harding (12 June 1921 – 3 February 2004) was an Australian politician and rugby league footballer. Born in Bowen, Queensland, he was educated at Townsville Grammar School before serving in the military 1942–44. On his return he became a furniture retailer.

In 1961, Harding was elected to the Australian House of Representatives as the Labor member for Herbert, defeating Liberal MP John Murray. He held the seat until his defeat in 1966, after which he became a company director. Harding died in 2004.

References

1921 births
2004 deaths
People from North Queensland
Australian Labor Party members of the Parliament of Australia
Members of the Australian House of Representatives for Herbert
Members of the Australian House of Representatives
20th-century Australian politicians